Heroic verse is a term that may be used to designate epic poems, but which is more usually used to describe the meter(s) in which those poems are most typically written (regardless of whether the content is "heroic" or not). Because the meter typically used to narrate heroic deeds differs by language and even within language by period, the specific meaning of "heroic verse" is dependent upon context.

Greek and Latin

The oldest Greek verseform, and the Greek line for heroic verse, is the dactylic hexameter, which was already well-established in the 9th and 8th centuries B.C.E. when the Iliad and Odyssey were composed in this meter.

The Saturnian was used in Latin epics of the 3rd century B.C.E., but few examples remain and the meter is little understood. Beginning at least with Ennius (239–169 B.C.E.) dactylic hexameter was introduced in imitation of the Greeks, thereafter becoming the Latin heroic meter.

The Greek/Roman dactylic hexameter exerted a huge influence over the subsequent poetic practice of much of Europe, whether by the new accentual verseforms it evolved into (as the medieval riming leonine verse), by attempts at reviving it either quantitatively or accentually (as by Alberti, Stanyhurst, Klopstock, Longfellow, Bridges, and many others), or simply as an ideal of what a nation's heroic verse should aspire to.

English

Alliterative verse (as exemplified by Beowulf) was the heroic verse of Old English, as, in several closely-related forms, it was for all Germanic languages more or less during the first millennium C.E.

The Alliterative Revival (mainly of the 14th century) likely constituted a continuation (though in evolved form) of the earlier tradition. However, around 1380 Geoffrey Chaucer developed the English iambic pentameter, based chiefly on the Italian endecasillabo and composed chiefly in couplets or in rime royal. Although Chaucer's practice was largely preserved to the north by the Scottish Chaucerians (James I of Scotland, Robert Henryson, William Dunbar and Gavin Douglas), in England itself changes in pronunciation or taste soon rendered Chaucer's technique extinct, and iambic pentameter disappeared for over 100 years.

The practice in these years has been characterized as incompetent ("bad shambling heroics"), but alternatively as a distinct meter that embraces lines that qualify as well-formed iambic pentameter as well as others that don't. Jakob Schipper for example, laid out a 16-type pattern for "five-accent verse":

 (×) / × / (×)  |  (×) / × / × / (×)
 
 where /=accented syllable; ×=unaccented syllable; (×)=optional; and |=caesura

which he then further multiplied by allowing that sometimes the caesura could appear elsewhere (most commonly after the third accent):

 (×) / × / × / (×)  |  (×) / × / (×)

C. S. Lewis in fact denominated this verse the "fifteenth-century heroic" while both simplifying and broadening its metrical definition: a line with a sharp medial caesura, each resulting half-line having from 2 to 3 stresses, most hovering between 2 and 3. Lewis exemplifies his conception of the "fifteenth-century heroic line" with this excerpt from The Assembly of Gods:

Iambic pentameter was re-developed by Wyatt and Surrey in the 1530s or 1540s. It was Surrey's line (modeled this time on the French vers de dix) as finessed by Philip Sidney and Edmund Spenser that was re-embraced as English heroic verse. Using this line, Surrey also introduced blank verse into English, previous instances being rimed.

The fourteener vied with iambic pentameter as the English heroic verse during the mid-16th-century, especially for translation from classical drama and narrative, notably: Jasper Heywood's translations of Seneca (1559-1561), Arthur Golding's translation of Ovid's Metamorphoses (1567), and George Chapman's Iliad (1598-1611).

However, landmark works like Gorboduc (1561), portions of The Mirror for Magistrates (1559-1610), Tamburlaine (c. 1587), Astrophel and Stella (1580s, published 1591), and The Faerie Queene (1590-1596), established the iambic pentameter—rimed for narrative and lyric and largely unrimed for drama—as the English heroic line.

The heroic couplet is a pair of iambic pentameter lines that rime together. Frequently, the term is associated with the balanced, closed couplets that dominated English verse from roughly 1640 to 1790, although the form dates back to Chaucer, and remains in use often in a looser form. John Denham exemplifies, and describes (while addressing the River Thames), the neoclassical closed heroic couplet:

The heroic quatrain (also "elegiac quatrain") is a stanza of iambic pentameter riming ABAB.

French

In France the décasyllabe and alexandrine have taken turns as the language's heroic verseform: first, the  appearing in the 11th century; then, around 1200 the alexandrine began its first period of dominance; however, by 1400 the  had again been established as the French heroic verse, completely ousting the alexandrine. The alexandrine, in a slightly stricter form, was resurrected in the middle of the 16th century by the poets of the Pléiade, and has retained its status since then.

Notes and references

Notes

References

Sources

Further reading 
 

Types of verses
History of poetry